Heaton Norris is a suburb of the Metropolitan Borough of Stockport, Greater Manchester, England. It is part of the Four Heatons, and neighbours Heaton Chapel, Heaton Mersey and Heaton Moor. Within the boundaries of the historic county of Lancashire, in 1835 part of Heaton Norris was annexed to the County Borough of Stockport, with Heaton Chapel and Heaton Moor following in 1894 and the remnant in 1913.

History 
Historically part of Lancashire, Heaton Norris was part of the Manchester barony of the Grelley family, but between 1162 and 1180 it belonged to William le Norreys.

In the early 13th century, Heaton Norris, a sub manor of Manchester, encompassed all of the Four Heatons. It was escheated (i.e. reverted) to the manor of Manchester in around 1280. In 1322, there were 32 dwellings suggesting a population of 150, the ten freeholders of the escheated manor had the right to graze on common pasture and to cut wood. There was no chapel of ease, unlike neighbouring St Ostwalds at Didsbury, and it did not get one until St Thomas' was built in 1758.

The township remained part of the parish of Manchester in the Salford Hundred of Lancashire until 1835 when the southern portion of the parish was absorbed into Stockport. In 1894, under the Local Government Act 1894, it was divided again, with a portion becoming part of Stockport county borough in  Cheshire, and the remaining part forming the Heaton Norris urban district in Lancashire.  A further  transferred in 1901, and the remainder, Heaton Moor and Heaton Chapel, was added to Stockport county borough in 1913. There was a plebiscite in the 1930s on whether the area wished to become part of Manchester again, but the vote was lost.  In 1901, the population was recorded as 26,251. Since 1974, it has formed part of the Metropolitan Borough of Stockport in Greater Manchester.

Weaving was first recorded in 1580 and by 1776 farms were being advertised as having cowsheds and large loom houses. In spite of the industrial developments nearby in Stockport and Manchester, most of Heaton Norris remained agricultural, though in 1836 there were 20 mills employing upwards of 5,000. The rural nature changed with the arrival of the railway station at Heaton Norris in 1840 and Heaton Chapel in 1852, when the area became largely residential in order to house workers in local mills. The majority of Heaton Norris is characterised by deck-access or high-rise estates (such as Lancashire Hill) and Victorian terraced housing.

Heaton Norris Rovers, now known as Stockport County Football Club, was formed in 1883, and used to play on a pitch behind the Nursery Inn on Green Lane. In 1902, they left the Green Lane ground and moved to Edgeley Park.

Geography 
Heaton Norris, Heaton Mersey, Heaton Moor and Heaton Chapel are on the north bank of the River Mersey, and south of the Cringle Brook, to the west of Reddish and the River Tame. The land slopes gently towards the north from a high point in the south above a steep descent to the Mersey. Most of the townships are between 60 m and 70 m above sea level, and 30 m to 60 m above the river. Heaton Norris is about 7 km south of St Ann's Square, Manchester. The soil is clay on marl and red sandstone.

The former Manchester to Buxton Roman road and the later turnpike, now the A6, pass through Heaton Norris, as does the London to Manchester railway. This is carried from Edgeley to Heaton Norris by the large brick-built Stockport Viaduct.

Along the north bank of the River Mersey ran the Great Central Railway's line from Warrington to Stockport (1852). Today, this route is used by the M60 motorway; Junction 1 (formerly Junction 12 of the M63) serves Heaton Norris.

The Stockport branch of the Ashton Canal terminated at Heaton Norris.

Industry
In 1820, William Nelstrop established his flour mill on Lancashire Hill. Nelstrop's Albion Flour Mills were rebuilt on the same site in 1893 following a fire. The company is now one of Britain's largest independent flour millers.

Community facilities 
Notable landmarks in Heaton Norris include Bryant's Warehouse, a large B&Q superstore which was, when first opened, the largest in the country and  Bowerfold Open Space, known locally as The Bonks, popular with locals for dog walking, horse riding, its football pitch, and, after heavy snowfalls, sledging. All Saints' Church, designed by Preston and Vaughan and consecrated in 1888, is on the corner of Manchester Road and All Saints Road and runs a number of community projects such as the award winning free music school for children, 'Heaton's Hotpots' free meals and various groups for children, young people and families. The church also has an active brass band and choir.

In popular culture 
In the 1990s BBC television series The Mrs Merton Show, and its spin-off sitcom, Mrs Merton and Malcolm (1999), the title character, Mrs Merton, played by Greater Manchester native Caroline Aherne, often refers to living in Heaton Norris. The latter series was set in the area.

Another BBC comedy series, Early Doors, principally written by and starring Aherne's collaborator Craig Cash (also a former Heaton Norris resident), revolved around a failing pub, which by inference and local references was also in Heaton Norris. The pub was set in The Grapes, situated in Stockport, and based on the Three Crowns in Heaton Norris.

Some of the scenes for the BBC1 comedy drama Sunshine, starring Steve Coogan, Bernard Hill, Craig Cash and Phil Mealey, were filmed in the Nursery Inn, a local pub. Part of an advert for Paddy Power starring Rhodri Giggs was also filmed in Heaton Norris Park.

See also
Christ Church, Heaton Norris

References

External links
 Heaton Moor Council link
 Discussion of the boundary of Cheshire

Areas of Stockport